Henry de Trafford (fl. 1312) was an English politician.

He was a Member (MP) of the Parliament of England for Lancashire in 1312.

References

13th-century births
14th-century deaths
English MPs 1312
Members of the Parliament of England (pre-1707) for Lancashire